Republic of Ireland women's national under-17 football team represents Republic of Ireland in international youth football competitions.

FIFA U-17 Women's World Cup

The team has qualified in 2010

UEFA Women's Under-17 Championship

Previous squads

2010 FIFA U-17 Women's World Cup

See also

Republic of Ireland women's national football team
Republic of Ireland women's national under-19 football team
FIFA U-17 Women's World Cup
UEFA Women's Under-17 Championship

References

External links 
  Republic of Ireland women's national under-17 football team @www.fai.ie

Republic of Ireland
under-17